Michael J. Forde (born August 14, 1954) is a labor union activist and, since 2000, EST (Executive Secretary Treasure of the N.Y.C. District Council of Carpenters, an affiliate of the UBC (United Brotherhood of Carpenters and Joiners of America).  Mr. Forde was fired on August 10, 2009 from the position of EST.

Early life and career
Forde was born August 14, 1954 in Woodside, Queens.  His father was Martin Forde, who was a Carpenter Official.  He is married to his wife Mary Jane and has two children.  He attended Hunter College, but it is unknown if he graduated with a degree.  His early career was as a court room stenographer, but he left that to work as a Union Carpenter, joining Local Union 608 on October 1, 1980.

Local 608 Tenure
After working as a Carpenter for a number of years, mostly on Acoustical Ceilings, Mike Forde was appointed as a Union Organizer by Local 608 President, Paschal McGuinness.  He served in this appointed position, until he was elected Business Agent of Local 608 in 1993.  In 1994, Forde was elected Vice President of Local 608.  After the retirement of Patrick J Harvey, Mike Forde became President of Local 608 in 1996

District Council Tenure
After the N.Y.C. District Council of Carpenters came out of trusteeship, Forde was elected EST - Executive Secretary Treasurer of the council (2000), overseeing all the Organizers and Business Agents of all 11 Carpenters Local Unions of New York City.  Forde held this position, until being fired in August 2009.  After being elected to the EST position, Forde was forced to give up his Local 608 position of President and Business Manager, due to a RICO Consent Decree rule, even though previous DC Officials were able to keep their local positions.

Rise to the Executive Secretary Treasurer
From 1996–2000, the N.Y.C. District Council of Carpenters was under a trusteeship, due to the previous administration.  The RICO Consent Decree required the Council to have an all member election, and Mike Forde was elected as the EST, a position that is very powerful—the authority to hire and fire all Organizers and Business Agents, as well as being the Chairman of the lucrative Benefit Funds.  Forde has gone on to win the position of EST in 2004 and 2008, but not without incident.

Turmoil in the Carpenters
In September 2000, Mike Forde and 37 other individuals were indicted for Bribery, including Local 608 Business Agent Martin Devereaux.  Forde was accused of accepting a $50,000 bribe to allow non union labor to work at the Park Central Hotel, in New York City.  After a long delay for unknown reasons (3 years and 9 months), Forde was convicted in 2004.  His able lawyers were able to convince the Judge to set aside the verdict, and a new trial was ordered in 2005.  This trial was finally held again in 2008, and Forde was acquitted.  Most of the other 37 defendants had pleaded guilty, including Steven Crea

In September 2007, Judge Haight, who oversees the enforcement of the District Council's consent decree found Forde to be in contempt, as a result of rigging the job referral system to benefit his friends and associates - Forde was fined $10,000 for this infraction.  This was the second occurrence of Mr. Forde being found to manipulate the out of work list.

On August 5, 2009, a new 29 count indictment was revealed that accuse Mike Forde and 9 other individuals, including two local 608 Business Agents, of bribe taking, and allowing contractors to knowingly hire carpenters and pay them in cash, defrauding the Carpenters Benefit Funds of over $10 Million. They are assumed to be innocent, and Mike Forde was even at work on the following day.  On August 10, 2009, Mike Forde was fired from his position of Executive Secretary Treasurer of the New York City District Council of Carpenters.  Shortly after the Forde was indicted and fired, a cache of drugs (OxyContin) and a stun gun were found hidden in the offices of the Labor Technical College of the District Council.  The Assistant United States Attorney has stated that Mike Forde tested positive for both cocaine and marijuana at the time of his arrest.

In July 2010, Mike Ford plead guilty to the most recent charges, including taking bribes from contractors to pay workers cash, and allowing non-union workers onto job sites. These crimes are very similar to the crimes that his father, Martin was convicted of back in 1990.

Mike Forde was sentenced to 11 years in prison, and will have to pay restitution to the union funds that he defrauded.  Just after sentencing, Mr. Forde asked the Judge if he could be enrolled in a Drug and Alcohol Treatment program while serving his term.  He must turn himself in to the authorities before January 7, 2011. Because of a snafu with the paperwork, Forde's entry date to the Federal Prison System was postponed to a later date of February 7, 2011, and the judge announced that the Federal Bureau of Prisons has chosen a prison in West Virginia for Mr. Forde to serve his time.

Mike Forde was serving his sentence in McDowell Federal Correction Center in West Virginia, with an expected release date of September 6, 2020.

As of May 4, 2015 Mike Forde [Register Number: 62573-054] is currently at Ray Brook FCI, Ray Brook, NY

References

1954 births
Living people
American trade unionists of Irish descent
People from Woodside, Queens
Hunter College alumni
United Brotherhood of Carpenters and Joiners of America people